Parotocinclus jequi is a species of catfish in the family Loricariidae. It is native to South America, where it occurs in the headwaters of the Jequitinhonha River basin in Brazil. It is found in areas with clear water, marginal vegetation, a substrate of rocks or pebbles, and a depth of 0.3 to 1.2 m (0.98 to 3.94 ft). The species reaches 5.4 cm (2.1 inches) SL.

References 

Loricariidae
Otothyrinae
Fish of the Jequitinhonha River basin
Fish described in 2013